Duck's head is a Chinese snack made by adding spices and herbs to a stir-fried head of duck. It is a popular dish in many parts of China, including Wuhan and Shanghai. One duck's head store claims that the snack "helps your own brain power". It has a crispy taste and is written to be a healthy food with no known health drawbacks. Kellie Schmitt of CNN describes duck's head as one of "Shanghai's weirdest foods".

History
Duck's head is not a modern invention; one specialty restaurant, Dongshan Duck's Head, has been around for generations.

Preparation and description
According to Pang Xijing, who is the owner of a Wuhan-based duck's head eating establishment, the snack is prepared by first leaving frozen duck heads under running water for some three hundred and sixty minutes, before stir-frying the heads with some herbs and spices. The Shanghai-based Jiu Jiu Ya makes duck's head by stewing the heads "in a potent mix of 30 Chinese herbs and barley rice". Duck's head is described to have a crispy taste – a result of the stir-frying.

Consumption and nutritional value
The bulk of duck's head is not digestible; only the skin is eaten, while the rest of the snack is just gnawed by consumers. It can be accompanied by alcoholic liquids like beer.

Cultural impact
Kellie Schmitt of CNN calls duck's head one of "Shanghai's weirdest foods". One duck's head store claims that the snack "helps your own brain power".

References

Chinese cuisine